The 1991 Lion Cup was the ninth edition of the Lion Cup, the premier domestic rugby union knock-out competition in South Africa.

Teams
All 25 South African provincial teams took part in this competition. The semi-finalists from the 1990 Lion Cup were put into Group A and the losing quarter finalists into Group B. The remaining teams were divided geographically. Groups C and D contained nine southern teams; the four southern teams with the highest ranking were put into Group C and the other five teams into Group D (where the two lowest-ranked teams,  and  had to play off in a qualifying game for the Group D spot in Round One). Similarly, Groups E and F contained eight northern teams; the four northern teams with the highest ranking were put into Group E and the other four teams into Group F:

Competition

This competition was a knock-out competition. A qualifying round was held between the two lowest-ranked teams for the Group D place in Round One. In each of the first three rounds, the lower-ranked teams would have home advantage. In Round One, the teams from Group D hosted teams from Group D, while the teams from Group F hosted teams from Group F. In Round Two, the winners of the eight Round One ties played against each other for a place in Round Three. The winners of the four Round Two matches then joined teams in Group B for Round Three, with the winning teams progressing to the quarter finals (where they were joined by the teams from Group A), followed by Semi-Finals and the Final.

Fixtures and results

The fixtures were as follows:

Qualifying round

Round one

Round two

Round three

Quarter-finals

Semi-finals

Final

See also
 1991 Currie Cup
 1991 Currie Cup / Central Series
 1991 Currie Cup Central A
 1991 Currie Cup Central B
 1991 Currie Cup Central / Rural Series
 1991 Currie Cup Rural C
 1991 Currie Cup Rural D

References

1991
1991 in South African rugby union
1991 rugby union tournaments for clubs